Warmian–Masurian Voivodeship, also known as Warmia–Masuria Province and Warmia–Mazury Province, is a voivodeship (province) in northeastern Poland. Its capital and largest city is Olsztyn.

Warmian–Masurian Voivodeship was created on 1 January 1999 from the entire Olsztyn Voivodeship, the western half of Suwałki Voivodeship, and part of Elbląg Voivodeship, pursuant to the Polish local government reforms adopted in 1998. The province's name derives from two historic regions, Warmia and Mazury.

The province borders Podlaskie Voivodeship to the east, Masovian Voivodeship to the south, Kuyavian-Pomeranian Voivodeship to the southwest, Pomeranian Voivodeship to the west, the Vistula Lagoon to the northwest, and the Kaliningrad Oblast (an exclave of Russia) to the north. Its borders largely overlap the southern two-thirds of former East Prussia, which was assigned to Poland after World War II.

History 
The region was originally inhabited by the Old Prussian clan of the Warmians, from whom the name Warmia originated. During the northern Crusade, the Old Prussians were conquered by the Teutonic Order; their land was granted to the order by the pope, and the region became part of the State of the Teutonic Order. The Order encouraged colonization by German settlers in Warmia (Ostsiedlung) and Polish colonists from the region of Masovia, called Masurians (Mazurzy), hence the name Masuria. The Old Prussians became assimilated into the newcomers and thus became extinct.

During the Teutonic rule, the region experienced a process of urbanization and economic boost due to the expansion of the Hanseatic League into the region. The Order later attacked their former ally Poland and conquered the region of Pomerelia, beginning a long-lasting conflict with Poland, which subsequently entered into an alliance with Lithuania. In Masuria, the Poles and Lithuanians defeated the Order at the Battle of Grunwald. The wars eventuated in a rebellion by the urban populations of Pomerelia and Warmia, who were affected by the Teutons' numerous wars; upon the urban populations' request, the region was incorporated into Poland by King Casimir IV Jagiellon, and after the Thirteen Years' War it remained under Polish suzerainty, but was divided into two parts: Elbląg and Warmia were incorporated directly into the Kingdom of Poland, while Masuria became a Polish fief under the control of the Teutonic Order.

The state of the Teutonic Order ceased to exist in 1525 when Grandmaster Albert Hohenzollern introduced secularisation, proclaimed the Duchy of Prussia, and became a vassal of Sigismund I of Poland. The Prussian  Hohenzollern line became extinct in 1618 with the death of Albert Frederick, and the Duchy was inherited by the Brandenburgian line; Prussia simultaneously entered into a personal union with the electorate of Brandenburg known as Brandenburg-Prussia, remaining under Polish suzerainty until the Treaty of Oliva in 1660. The throne was inherited by Frederick I of Prussia who wanted to unite the Duchy with Brandenburg and also wanted to proclaim himself king of Prussia and therefore participated in the Russian-initiated Partitions of Poland in which Warmia was annexed by the Kingdom of Prussia, and henceforth became part of the newly established province of East Prussia until 1945. Together with the rest of the Kingdom, the region became part of the North German Confederation, the German Empire, the Weimar Republic, and Nazi Germany. After the end of World War II, both the German as well as the Slavic Masurian population were expelled by the Polish government. In 1914, the province turned into a battlefield, seeing notable battles such as the Battle of Tannenberg as part of the Eastern Front of World War I.

Amongst the most visited sights is the Masurian Lake District, which contains more than 2,000 lakes, including the largest lakes of Poland, Śniardwy and Mamry. Other recognizable landmarks are the Warmian castles (Lidzbark Warmiński Castle, Pieniężno Castle, Olsztyn Castle) and the Cathedral Hill in Frombork, where Polish astronomer Nicolaus Copernicus lived and worked. The Lidzbark Warmiński Castle was later the residence of Ignacy Krasicki, nicknamed the Prince of Polish Poets. The Grunwald battlefield in Masuria is site of the annual reenactment of one of the largest battles of Medieval Europe. Święta Lipka in Masuria and Gietrzwałd in Warmia are popular pilgrimage sites.

The Warmian–Masurian Voivodeship has the largest number of ethnic Ukrainians living in Poland due to forced relocations (such as Operation Vistula) carried out by the Soviet and Polish Communist authorities.

Ethnic and religious structure

In year 1824, shortly before its merger with West Prussia, the population of East Prussia was 1,080,000 people. Of that number, according to Karl Andree, Germans were slightly more than half, while 280,000 (~26%) were ethnically Polish and 200,000 (~19%) were ethnically Lithuanian. As of year 1819 there were also 20,000 strong ethnic Kursenieki and Latvian minorities as well as 2,400 Jews, according to Georg Hassel. Similar numbers are given by August von Haxthausen in his 1839 book, with a breakdown by county. But the majority of East Prussian Polish and Lithuanian inhabitants were Lutherans, not Roman Catholics like their ethnic kinsmen across the border in the Russian Empire. Only in Southern Warmia (German: Ermland) Catholic Poles – so called Warmiaks (not to be confused with predominantly Protestant Masurians) – comprised the majority of population, numbering 26,067 people (~81%) in county Allenstein (Polish: Olsztyn) in 1837. Another minority in 19th-century East Prussia, were ethnically Russian Old Believers, also known as Philipponnen – their main town was Eckersdorf (Wojnowo).

In year 1817, East Prussia had 796,204 Evangelical Christians, 120,123 Roman Catholics, 864 Mennonites and 2,389 Jews.

Cities and towns 

The Voivodeship contains 3 cities and 47 towns. These are listed below in descending order of population (according to official figures for 2019):

Administrative division 

Warmian–Masurian Voivodeship is divided into 21 counties (powiaty): 2 city counties and 19 land counties. These are further divided into 116 gminas.

The counties are listed in the following table (ordering within categories is by decreasing population).

Tourism 
Palaces and Gothic castles, former seats of the Teutonic Order, seats of Chapter houses and bishops provide a number of attractions for tourists. Gothic churches such as the Archcathedral of Frombork and the collegiate church in Dobre Miasto, as well as churches in Orneta and Kętrzyn delight visitors with the uniqueness of their architectonic details. In collections of the Warmia and Mazury Museum in Olsztyn, visitors can find numerous tokens from the time when Nicolaus Copernicus lived in Warmia.

Protected areas

Protected areas in Warmian–Masurian Voivodeship include eight areas designated as Landscape Parks, as listed below:
 Brodnica Landscape Park (partly in Kuyavian-Pomeranian Voivodeship)
 Dylewo Hills Landscape Park
 Elbląg Upland Landscape Park
 Górzno-Lidzbark Landscape Park (partly in Kuyavian-Pomeranian and Masovian Voivodeships)
 Iława Lake District Landscape Park (partly in Pomeranian Voivodeship)
 Masurian Landscape Park
 Puszcza Romincka Landscape Park
 Wel Landscape Park

The Łuknajno Lake nature reserve (part of Masurian Landscape Park) is a protected wetland site under the Ramsar convention, as well as being designated by UNESCO as a biosphere reserve.

International relations

Twin towns – sister cities
The Warmian–Masurian Voivodeship is twinned with:
 Podolsk, Russia

Gallery

Emoji flag
Unicode consortium defined a way for software vendors to encode regional flags in their Emoji 5.0 standard in 2017. Warmian–Masurian Voivodeship flag would be represented as U+1F3F4, U+E0070, U+E006C, U+E0032, U+E0038, U+E007F, i.e. , somewhat based on the PL-28 ISO 3166-2:PL code. Between the standard publication in 2017 and ISO 3166-2:PL update in 2018 the code was PL-WN, therefore the corresponding flag sequence would be U+1F3F4, U+E0070, U+E006C, U+E0077, U+E006E, U+E007F, i.e. .

See also 
 Masurian dialect
 Nidka river

Notes

References

External links

 Official website of Warmian-Masurian Voivodeship

 
States and territories established in 1999